The Pentangular Trophy was a first-class cricket competition that was held intermittently in Pakistan between 1973–74 and 2011–12.

History
The Pentangular Trophy was first contested in 1973–74. From 1977–78 through to 1979–80 it was known as the BCCP Invitation Tournament. Between 1980–81 and 1986–87, with the exception of 1983–84 when it was not held, it was called the PACO Cup under the sponsorship of the Pakistan Automobile Corporation. After 1983–84, it was only held three times, in 1990–91, 1994–95 and 1995–96, until it was revived in 2005–06. In 2007–08 it became a five-team regional tournament and was then held every season until 2011–12, after which it again went into abeyance.

Format
As the name suggests, the Pentangular Trophy was usually contested between five teams, although there were sometimes as many as ten, who played each other on a round-robin basis, with the winner being the determined by the leader in the points table or by means of a final. The participants were originally selected by the Board of Control for Cricket in Pakistan (BCCP) before qualification criteria were introduced. Commonly this was the top teams in the two leading first-class competitions played earlier in the season, the Quaid-e-Azam Trophy and the Patron's Trophy.

Winners

References

Pakistani domestic cricket competitions
Pakistani cricket in the 21st century
Recurring sporting events established in 1973
Recurring sporting events disestablished in 2012
First-class cricket competitions
Defunct cricket competitions
Defunct sports competitions in Pakistan